The As I Am Tour was the third worldwide concert tour by American singer-songwriter Alicia Keys, in support of her third studio album, As I Am (2007). According to Pollstar, Alicia Keys' As i Am Tour grossed $32 million worldwide in 2008/2009, with 55 shows.

Opening acts
 Jordin Sparks (North America) (Oceania) (select venues)
 Ne-Yo (North America) (select venues)
 Solange Knowles (Europe) (select venues)
 Stephen Marley (Europe) (select venues)
 Jermaine Paul (Europe) (select venues)
 The Ruling Party (Europe) (select venues)

Set list
 "Ghetto Story"
 "Waiting For Your Love"
 "Where Do We Go From Here"
 "You Don't Know My Name"
 "Teenage Love Affair"
 "Heartburn"
 "Sure Looks Good To Me"
 "How Come You Don't Call Me"
 "Butterflyz"
 "Goodbye"
 "Prelude To A Kiss"
 "Superwoman"
 "I Need You"
 "Wreckless Love"
 "Diary" (contains excerpts from "Tender Love")
 "My Boo"
 "Unbreakable" (contains excerpts from "Step in the Name of Love")
 "Like You'll Never See Me Again"
 "Feeling U, Feeling Me"
 "Go Ahead"
 "A Woman's Worth"
 "Lesson Learned" 
"So Simple" 
 "Karma"
 "Thing About Love"
 "Fallin'" (contains excerpts from "It's a Man's Man's Man's World")

Encore

Tour dates

Notes

a This concert was a part of the North Sea Jazz Festival.
b This concert was a part of the Moon & Stars Festival .
c This concert was a part of the Montreux Jazz Festival.

d This concert was a part of the Umbria Jazz Festival.
e This concert was a part of the Lucca Summer Festival.
f This concert was a part of the Singfest.
g These concerts were a part of A Day on the Green.

 Cancellations
February 25, 2008   Glasgow, Scotland   Scottish Exhibition and Conference Centre
February 26, 2008   Manchester, England   Manchester Evening News Arena (later postponed to July 9, 2008)
April 22, 2008   Pittsburgh, Pennsylvania   Peterson Events Center
April 24, 2008   Cleveland, Ohio   Wolstein Center

Critical reception
Cathy Rose A. Garcia from The Korea Times found Keys’ concert at the Jamsil Gymnasium in Soul “fierce” and stated that “Keys had the audience in the palm of her hand” while “show[ing] off her strong vocals to full effect”. Ben Werner from The Orange County Register felt that “Keys hasn’t quite blossomed into a master of the form, her balance of choreographed routines and moments alone tickling the ivories never flowing as seamlessly as it should” but, however, found the concert “mostly satisfying”.

Personnel
 Tour Director: Steve Dixon
 Production Designers: Nick Whitehouse, Steve Dixon, Bryan Leitch, VYV
 Lighting Designer: Nick Whitehouse
 Lighting Directors: Steven Douglas, Dom Smith, Chris Steel

References

External links 

2008 concert tours
Alicia Keys concert tours